Konar-e Siah (also Romanized as Konār-e Sīāh, Kenār Sāyeh, Kenār Seyāh, and Konār-e Seyāh; also known as Kunārsiāh and Kuner Sīāh) is a village in Faramarzan Rural District, Jenah District, Bastak County, Hormozgan Province, Iran. At the 2006 census, its population was 1,029, in 185 families.

References 

Populated places in Bastak County